Missa may refer to:

 Mass (liturgy)
 Mass (music), a choral composition that sets liturgical text to music
 Missa brevis
 Missa solemnis (explains the term and lists several works)
 Miss A, a Korean girl group
 Missa pro defunctis and Missa defunctorum,  alternative names for the Requiem mass
 For the etymological root of missa see Ite missa est
 Missa, a 1997 EP by Dir En Grey

See also
Mass (disambiguation)
Missal (disambiguation)
Ordo missae Order of Mass